Macnish is a surname. Notable people with the surname include:

 Andrew Macnish (born 1965), Australian footballer
 David MacNish (1812–1863), New Zealand interpreter
 Donald Macnish (1841–1927), Ontario politician
 John Macnish (born 1956), British television producer
 Robert Macnish (1802–1837), Scottish surgeon and philosopher
 William Macnish (1842–1873), Australian cricketer

See also
 McNish, surname